Ramesh Kshitij (born on 25 April 1969); Salyan, Western Nepal) is a versatile poet, lyricist and a writer. He is best known for the poetry, he has also written stories and songs.

Early life 
Ramesh Kshitij spent his childhood at Mirauli, Hekuli of Dang and received his early education from Sidda Janata Secondary School, Shri Gaon at Dang, Western Nepal. He started his higher education from Nepal Law Campus, Kathmandu and completed his LLM (Master of Laws) from Tribhuvan University.  He then joined the civil service, Government of Nepal in the year 1999 (BS 2056). He has worked in various districts Dang, Rolpa and Dhading as a Local Development Officer of the Government of Nepal.

Writings and publications 
He started writing poems at an early age. He wrote poems while he studied at class IV and a play at class VI. His poems have been published in different newspapers and literary magazines.  His first volume of poems "Arko Sanjh Parkhera Saanjhma" was published in 2000 (BS 2057) with a preface by the famous poet Tulsi Diwas.

The famous Nepali poet and critic Mr. Hari Adhikary has written in his criticism about the second anthology Ghar Farkiraheko Manis that, "Amongst the new generation of Nepali poets, the poetry of Ramesh Kshitij stands along; it defies any categorization."

During his service as a Local Development Officer in the far and rural districts of Nepal, he has visualized humanity and pain of people in his poetry. He is far-reaching in its scope of experience. The poems of Ramesh Kshitij can offer a profound symbolism and also a delightful dignity. Whatever the inner meaning of Kshitij's poetry, we can easily appreciate the beautiful language and lyrical quality of his poetic vision.

"Tirkhayeko Kakakul Sari Vaye, Kunai Namitho Bhul Sari Vaye" was sung by the famous Nepali singer Mr.Rajesh Payal Rai which was recorded in Radio Nepal in 2047 B.S. for the first time. Another of his songs which was sung by Rajesh Payal Rai was "Namaga Masanga Sahara Namaga, Bhuima Chhu Aakashka Juntara Namaga..", for which he was honoured as best lyricist in 2050 B.S..

Batuwaa he maanchhe vannu yo sansaaramaa
Junjastai chamki hida andhakaarma
Bagchha aanshu ekaantamaa bagi jaana deu
Khushi tara boki hinda anuhaarma

This song was sung by Ms.Anju Panta which was included in Kshitij album. About a hundred songs of Kshitij have already been recorded which give a message of hope, inspiration, philosophical view, new thought and positive attitude out of which twenty-five songs have been recorded in Radio Nepal.

His songs are perhaps the most highly regarded. His works are noted for their rhythmic, optimistic, and lyrical nature. Either poetry or songs, through his creation he gives inspiration to live life, awareness and love to his readers.

Major books and album published

Poetry collections
 Arko Saanjh Parkhera Saanjhma, 2057 BS. Kathmandu: Fineprint, Nepal 2012.
 Ghar Farkiraheko Manis, Bhadra 2069 BS, Poush 2069 BS, Shrawan 2070 BS. Kathmandu: Fineprint, Nepal 2012

Song collection
 Aafai Aafno Sathi Bhaye, 2063 BS

Song album
 Kshitij, 2068 BS

Book(s) yet to come
 Ustai Chhu Ma (story collection)

Awards and honors
Kshitij has received many awards and honors.  He is well known lyricist and his Nepali song "Namaaga Masanga Sahaaraa Namaaga" received the best lyricist of the year BS 2050 (1993) honored by Radio Nepal. 
Apart from many honours and public felicitations, he was also awarded with the First National Poetry Festival Award, Rapti Literary Award and Mohan Regmi Smriti Samman felicitation.
His song album "Kshitij" was awarded with the Rapti Music Award BS 2069 in different genres. 
He has also been awarded by the Government of Nepal for 'Best Civil Servant of the year 2069' (2012) and Local Development Award in 2013 (BS 2070). 
Some most notable awards and felicitations he received include :
 1993 (BS 2050) : Best lyricist, Radio Nepal
 1994 (BS 2051) : First, National Poetry Festival, Nepal Academy
 2011 (BS 2068) : Rapti Literary Award
 2011 (BS 2068) : Mohan Regmi Smriti Sammaan
 2012 (BS 2069) : Rapti Music Award
 2012 (BS 2069) : Best Civil Service Award, Government of Nepal
 2013 (BS 2070) : Local Development Award

Fans

"Generally, a poet is like the Buddha and writing poems is a type of Bipasyana i.e. Meditation. A poet, like the Buddha, with his/her newfound eternal truth gotten by his/her meditative writings can have an amazing power of shaking a man's heart. A stanza of a poem can change our way of life and can fill with internal power and unfathomable energy." ~ (from Pahilo prem ra Priya Kabitako Atmakatha: Ghar Farkiraheko Manis).

After listening songs, studying stories and poetries like "Arko Sanjh Parkhera Saanjhma, Ghar Farkiraheko Maanis" written by the poet Ramesh Kshitij, a saintlike personality, his die-hard fans have formed a club named "Fan Club of Ramesh Kshitij" in 2012 (2069 BS). Similarly, the fan club organized for him a solo program of poem recitation known as "Kshitijkaa Kabitaa harusanga Haami" on 9 February 2012 (27th Magh 2069), at hotel Ratna Inn in Dharan, Eastern Nepal., It was probably the first time in Nepal that this type of solo programme of poem recitation could be held by his fans that were not associated with any literary organizations.

Interviews
 Kshitij Ekdamai Najikko Sathi ho, क्षितिज एकदमै नजिकको साथी हो
 Ma Sachha Kabitabadi Kabi, म सच्चा कवितावादी कवि, कलम, Sourya Dainik, Saturday, 8 December 2012
 Kabitama Dubda Dhyanma Basejasto Laagchha, कवितामा डुव्दा ध्यानमा बसेजस्तो लाग्छ, Blast Times, Thursday, 28 January 2013
 Fan Club of Ramesh Kshitij, फ्यान क्लब अफ रमेश क्षितिज, Sourya Dainik, Saturday, 18 May 2013

Notes (articles)
 Sabdavanda Kehi Para, शव्दभन्दा केही पर (Anuvuti), Kantipur, Saturday, 13 October 2012
 Oh Kabita My First Love, ओ कविता माई फस्र्ट लभ, Kabi Sambaad, Saptarang, Naya Patrika, Thursday, 11 October 2012
 Tokyoma Ek Din, टोकियोमा एक दिन, Nagarik, Saturday, 5 January 2013
 Dharan Pugda, धरान पुग्दा (Anubhuti), Kantipur Koseli, Saturday, 16 February 2013
 Katha (Story), Sourya Dainik
 Silvia, Sanjh ra Samunra, सिल्भिया, सांझ र समुद्र, Annapurna Post, Saturday 15 June 2013
 Naya Aabiskaarko Khojima Kabita, नयां आविष्कारको खोजीमा कविता, Koseli, Kantipur, Saturday, 10 August 2013
 "Dashain Samjhe Tihar Samjhe, दशैं सम्झे तिहार सम्झे"- Ramesh Kshitij, Nagarik, Saturday, 5 October 2013
 Kabita bhaneko kuntha ho : Kabita-sambad Ramesh Kshitijsanga, कविता भनेको कुण्ठा होइन : कविता–संवाद रमेश क्षितिजसँग, Naya Patrika, National Daily,Monday, 7 October 2013

See also
 Nepali literature
 List of Nepalese poets

References

External links
 Deepak Jadit, "Guff".... Hridayako Hridayaharusanga: Pustak Guff: Ghar Farkiraheko Manis
 Online Sahitya
 Shabdakosh: Ghar Farkiraheko Manis
 Majheri dot Com
 Kamala B.Sarup,"Ramesh Kshitij: Poet For Trust", Media for Freedom, Posted on: 2013-10-22

1969 births
Living people
People from Salyan District, Nepal
Nepalese male poets
Nepali-language poets
Nepali-language writers
Nepalese songwriters
20th-century Nepalese poets
21st-century Nepalese poets
20th-century male writers
21st-century male writers
Lyric poets
Nepali-language lyricists
20th-century Nepalese male writers